Without Walls Central Church was a Christian megachurch in Auburndale, Florida outside Lakeland co-founded by Paula and Randy White, in January 2004, when they were still married. It was under the  auspices of Without Walls International Church, Tampa, Florida. The Church closed in 2011 and should not be confused with Without Walls Church, a ministry for the homeless also based in Tampa, Florida.

History
In one year, the congregation grew from 125 to over 1,500. With growth of this scale, the Auburndale facility quickly became inadequate and, in April 2005, Pastor Scott began two Sunday morning worship services to accommodate the attendance. This, however, was only a short-term solution, as in September 2005, Without Walls Central Church moved to a new location at the former facility of Carpenter's Home Church in Lakeland, Florida. 

Pastors Scott and Cindy Thomas were the senior pastors at the church. Its operations included citywide ministry outreaches and relationships with city schools, businessmen, and government officials; networking with community organizations to help local residents; bringing well-known Christian artists and ministers to the community; and participating in city- and county-sponsored community activities.

In 2011, the Without Walls Central Church vacated the Lakeland building, as a result of debts. The United States bankruptcy court required Without Walls to sell their properties. In February 2015, the building was purchased by developers. Demolition commenced on 16 March 2015.

Location

Without Walls Central was located in Lakeland, Florida in the former facilities of Carpenter's Home Church. Lakeland is located between the cities of Tampa and Orlando.

Kay Fields

In November 2007, Kay Fields, a local school board member and member of Without Walls church, responded to suggested new standards for Florida science teaching by suggesting that the section that mentioned evolution be changed to require the teaching of intelligent design as well.

Notes

External links
Without Walls Central 
Without Walls Church

Former megachurches
Evangelical churches in Florida
Buildings and structures in Lakeland, Florida
Churches in Polk County, Florida
2004 establishments in Florida
2011 disestablishments in Florida
Buildings and structures demolished in 2015